Christ Blessing (Italian title: Cristo benedicente) is an oil on wood painting by the Italian Renaissance artist Raphael, executed c. 1500–1504. Since 1851, it is located in the Pinacoteca Tosio Martinengo, Brescia, Italy.

The features of Christ bear some resemblance to a self-portrait of Raphael's.

See also
 List of paintings by Raphael
 Italian Renaissance painting
 1505 in art#Works

Notes

References
 PDF in Wikimedia

External links

1500s paintings
Paintings by Raphael
Paintings depicting Jesus
Paintings in the collection of the Pinacoteca Tosio Martinengo